The modern Welsh Chess Championship was inaugurated in 1955.
The champion earned a place in the British Championship.

The Henry Golding Individual Trophy for the Welsh Champion

References
 (results through 1994)
 (results through 1986)

Men's Welsh Champions 1955–1970
Men's Welsh Champions from 1971
Ladies' Welsh Champions (1955 onwards)

External links
Welsh Chess Union

Chess national championships
Women's chess national championships
Championship
1955 in chess
Awards established in 1955
1955 establishments in Wales
National championships in Wales